Achim Müller (born 14 February 1938 in Detmold) is a German chemist. He is Professor Emeritus at the Faculty of Chemistry, University of Bielefeld.

His research involves mainly the chemistry of transition metals, especially with relation to nanochemistry.

His current research relates mainly to the synthesis of spherical porous metal oxide nanocapsules Mo132 Keplerates.  Müller has also worked on simple transition metal sulphur compounds, including related hydrodesulfurization catalysis and a new type of host guest chemistry based on polyoxovanadates  He has also strong interest in history and philosophy of science.

Academic career 
Achim Müller studied chemistry and physics at the University of Göttingen and received there his PhD degree (1965) and the Habilitation (1967). In 1971, he became professor at the University of Dortmund and in 1977 professor of Inorganic Chemistry at the University of Bielefeld. In 2006 he was awarded the Manchot-Forschungsprofessur of the Technische Universität München.  

Achim Müller is a member of the German Academy of Sciences Leopoldina, Polish Academy of Sciences, The Indian National Science Academy, National Academy of Exact Physical and Natural Sciences in Argentina, and Academia Europaea. He has received honorary degrees from the Russian Academy of Sciences (RAS) and the Université Pierre et Marie Curie, Paris as well as the “Profesor Honorario“ of the National University of La Plata.  He has also received the Alfred Stock Memorial Prize 2000, Prix Gay-Lussac/Humboldt 2001, Sir Geoffrey Wilkinson Prize 2001, and the Centenary Medal of the Royal Society of Chemistry 2008/9, London.  In 2012 he was awarded with the prestigious Advanced Grant by the European Research Council (ERC).  He is an Honorary Fellow of the Chemical Research Society of India.

Research 

His current research relates mainly to bottom-up pathways towards tailor-made spherical porous metal oxide nanocapsules Mo132 Keplerates. 
Müller's discovery of the molecular giant spheres (Keplerates) of the type Mo132 (diameter ca. 3 nm) and their derivatives, of the wheel shaped cluster Mo154 (Refs. and ) and hedgehog shaped cluster Mo368 (as large as 6 nm) has caused a paradigm shift due to the unique structural features and huge application range of these molecular nanoclusters .  

The capsule has 20 well-defined pores with crown-ether functions which may be reversibly opened and closed. Substrates enter through these pores, and they can react to form a variety of species depending on the internal tapestry of the nanocontainer. This inorganic nanocell also allows ion transport through the cavity. Several new phenomena under confined conditions can be studied by variation of the internal ligands with hydrophilic and/or hydrophobic character, based on a variety of reactive substrates inside (for the interdisciplinary character of the whole compound class see Ref.).  These single molecules are quite large; this can be shown by taking the length of an oxygen molecule with two atoms (length 0.12 nm) as a unit, then considering Mo368 which is 50 times larger.

All the mentioned nanomaterials belong to a class commonly termed polyoxometalates and some special ones to the molybdenum blue family; the elucidation by Müller of the chemical nature of molybdenum blue was a real tour de force. 

There are two older synthetic topics where Achim Müller did pioneering work. This refers to basic simple transition metal sulphur compounds, including related hydrodesulfurization catalysis and a new type of host guest chemistry based on polyoxovanadates  (for both topics see especially the three Honorary Issues under Bibliography). One paper about polyoxometalates was cited ca. 2000 times. The publications of Achim Müller were highlighted many times in the media and related magazines. Important last sentences: “Giant polyoxometalates (POMs) are of particular interest, as they are the largest inorganic molecules ever made, combined with fascinating structures and manifold applications in catalysis, medicine and material sciences. Typically, Müller‘s group has achieved great success in creating giant polyoxomolybdates (POMos) during the past two decades, establishing a series of incredibly large POMos with hundreds of Mo centers, such as {Mo132}, {Mo154}, {Mo176}, {Mo248} and {Mo368}. Especially {Mo368}, with more than 360 Mo atoms, still is the largest POM to date...“

Applications and Impact 
These are soluble in water and are very probably one of the most versatile materials regarding applications in nanoscience.
It is evident that such applications are of interest not only for chemistry but also for biology, supramolecular chemistry and materials science as well as discrete mathematics.
The applications include the following topics:

Investigating processes, including catalytic ones, under confined conditions, especially in capsules with stepwise tunable pores and tunable internal functions
Coordination chemistry at surfaces, in pores and in cavities of nanocapsules: sphere-surface supramolecular chemistry, controlled exchange of guests at different internal sites with each other and with the outside, nano ion-chromatography, nucleation processes under confined conditions
Modelling ion transport across transmembrane channels
New insights into hydrophobic interactions, e.g. thermodynamics of hydrophobic clustering, sequestration of hydrophobic organic pollutants, and nano-dewetting
Structure and dynamics of encapsulated high and low density water 
Towards multifunctionality and hierarchical complexity: examples for chemical adaptability and for a supramolecular chemical Darwinism, self-assembly of capsules into various patterns in different phases (e.g. blackberry-like hollow spherical assemblies as well as two- and three-dimensional structures)

Müller's related work shows many applications (see above), for example, how cellular processes like ion-transport can be modelled based on the spherical porous capsules and how the latter can be used to remove toxic compounds from water.

The compounds are studied worldwide by many groups especially in relation to potential applications in Materials Science (see Ref. and below). One aspect is modelling of the Lotus effect, another one is chemical adaptability as a new phenomenon.

An interesting mathematical treatment of the Keplerates could be developed in relation to spherical viruses and Buckminster Fuller Domes based on Archimedean and Platonic solids. The unique range of potential applications of the Mo132 Keplerates has also been highlighted by several other authors, e.g.: "Thus, Keplerate-type capsules represent unique supramolecular objects offering a tunable spatially-restricted environment and promising in many domains such as catalysis, electric conductivity, non-linear optics, liquid crystals, vesicles and "blackberry" aggregates. ...a key point to promote confined space engineering." In another publication  it is written: "Initiated and led by Müller and co-workers, the synthesis and structural characterization of protein-sized metal oxide clusters (2-6 nm) have generated great interest in the areas of physics, biology, chemistry, and materials science"; see also regarding a similar comment Ref. Some of the clusters can be obtained by planned synthesis, while the related derivative (also because of the structure of a Keplerate) Mo72Fe30 has unique magnetic properties.

Personal 
Müller likes ancient Greek philosophy, classical music, and mountain hiking. He has a love for woodland birds since his early childhood, a pastime which his father cherished also.

References

Bibliography
Honorary Issue of Inorganica Chimica Acta (Biography) with a dedication by E. Diemann and B. Krebs, 2010, 363, 4145.
 Honorary Issue of Journal Cluster Science with Foreword  by M. T. Pope, 2003, 14, 189.
 Honorary Issue of Journal of Molecular Structure with a Dedication by A. J. Barnes, E. Diemann, and H. Ratajczak, 2003, 656, 1.
 Prof. Achim Müller awarded 2001 Sir Geoffrey Wilkinson Prize, S. Migchielsen, G. Férey, Solid State Sciences, 2002, 4, 753 ; past winners include: M. F. Hawthorne (1993), F. A. Cotton (1995), Lord Jack Lewis (1997).
In a section about Achim Müller of  F. A Cotton's book (pp 310/11): My Life in the Golden Age of Chemistry: More Fun Than Fun, the author writes: “'The Most Unforgetable Character I Have Met.' For me Achim Müller could be that man."
See also the following titles:
 Inorganic Molecular Capsules: From Structure to Function, L. Cronin, Angew. Chem. Int. Ed., 2006, 45, 3576.
 Bringing inorganic chemistry to life, N. Hall, Chem. Commun., 2003, 803 (focus article).
 Author Profile, Angew. Chem. Int. Ed., 2013, 52, 800.
 See additionally Reference 16 b) l’actualité chimique.

External links 
Homepage at University Bielefeld

20th-century German chemists
Living people
1938 births
Members of Academia Europaea
Members of the European Academy of Sciences and Arts
Foreign Fellows of the Indian National Science Academy
European Research Council grantees
Members of the German Academy of Sciences Leopoldina
21st-century German chemists
Academic staff of Bielefeld University
People from Detmold